Mohamed Adel Gomaa (born 21 Mar 1993) is an Egyptian footballer who plays for Ismaily SC as a left-back.

Honors
Zamalek SC
Egypt Cup : 2014-15

External links
 

1989 births
Living people
Egyptian footballers
Al Mokawloon Al Arab SC players
Al Masry SC players
Zamalek SC players
Ismaily SC players
2015 Africa U-23 Cup of Nations players
Egyptian Premier League players
Association football fullbacks